Abrahamowicz is a Polish surname meaning "son of Abraham". Notable people with the surname include:

 Adolf Abrahamowicz (1849–1899), ethnic Armenian Austro-Hungarian writer 
 Dawid Abrahamowicz (1839–1926), ethnic Armenian Polish Austro-Hungarian politician, brother of Adolf
 Eugeniusz Abrahamowicz (1851–1905), ethnic Polish Austro-Hungarian politician
 Florian Abrahamowicz (born 1961), Austrian priest
 Krzysztof Abrahamowicz (1852–1916), Polish politician
 Mikołaj Abramowicz or Abrahamowicz (1590s–1651), Polish-Lithuanian soldier

Polish-language surnames
Patronymic surnames